Maryinskoye is a rural locality (a village) in Novlenskoye Rural Settlement, Vologodsky District, Vologda Oblast, Russia. The population was 59 as of 2002.

Geography 
The distance to Vologda is 62.5 km, to Novlenskoye is 2.5 km. Dmitriyevskoye is the nearest rural locality.

References 

Rural localities in Vologodsky District